Stefan Milojević (born 20 February 1991) is a Serbian football defender who last played for ViOn Zlaté Moravce. His father Goran Milojević was also a footballer.

Club career
While at Spain, Milojević started his career at Mallorca before returning to Serbia, where he joined Teleoptik as a professional.

In January 2012, he joined Slovak club MFK Košice on a two-year contract. After six months at the club, Milojević joined BSK Borča in July 2012. Milojević have since moved to Bežanija.

In January 2014, Milojević have been training with Airdrieonians and then joined the club until the end of a season following a trial. He made his debut for the club on 11 January 2014, in a 3-0 win over Ayr United. Since making his debut, Milojević have established himself in the first team and made sixteen appearances for the club. He helped the club survive in League One that he was offered a new contract, but Milojević rejected it.

Milojević signed for Greenock Morton under freedom of contract in June 2014 one a year-contract and revealed that he was linked with a move to Dunfermline Athletic, but preferred to join Morton, citing a better option. Milojević scored his first goal, in a 2-1 win over Peterhead on 23 August 2014. After suffering an injury late on in the season, Milojević was released at the end of his contract.

Honours
Morton
Scottish League One: 2014-15

Personal life
Born in Brest to a Serbian parents, Milojević moved to Spain when his father moved to a Spanish club and spent ten years in Spain, qualifying him for Spanish citizenship.

References

External links

MFK Košice profile

1991 births
Living people
Sportspeople from Brest, France
French footballers
Serbian footballers
Spanish footballers
French people of Serbian descent
Spanish people of Serbian descent
French emigrants to Spain
Association football defenders
FK Teleoptik players
FK BSK Borča players
FK Bežanija players
FK Dubnica players
FC VSS Košice players
Slovak Super Liga players
French expatriate footballers
French expatriate sportspeople in Slovakia
Serbian expatriate footballers
Serbian expatriate sportspeople in Slovakia
Expatriate footballers in Slovakia
Serbian expatriate sportspeople in Scotland
Expatriate footballers in Scotland
Greenock Morton F.C. players
Scottish Professional Football League players
Footballers from Brittany